Dame Christabel Harriette Pankhurst,  (22 September 1880 – 13 February 1958) was a British suffragette born in Manchester, England. A co-founder of the Women's Social and Political Union (WSPU), she directed its militant actions from exile in France from 1912 to 1913. In 1914, she supported the war against Germany. After the war, she moved to the United States, where she worked as an evangelist for the Second Adventist movement.

Early life
Christabel Pankhurst was the daughter of women's suffrage movement leader Emmeline Pankhurst and radical socialist Richard Pankhurst  and sister to Sylvia and Adela Pankhurst. Her father was a barrister and her mother owned a small shop. Christabel assisted her mother, who worked as the Registrar of Births and Deaths in Manchester. Despite financial struggles, her family had always been encouraged by their firm belief in their devotion to causes rather than comforts.

Nancy Ellen Rupprecht wrote, "She was almost a textbook illustration of the first child born to a middle-class family. In childhood as well as adulthood, she was beautiful, intelligent, graceful, confident, charming, and charismatic." Christabel enjoyed a special relationship with both her mother and father, who had named her after "Christabel", the poem by Samuel Taylor Coleridge ("The lovely lady Christabel / Whom her father loves so well"). Her mother's death in 1928 had a devastating impact on Christabel.

Education
Pankhurst learned to read at her home on her own before she went to school. She and her two sisters attended Manchester High School for Girls. She obtained a law degree from the University of Manchester, and received honours on her LL.B. exam but, as a woman, was not allowed to practise law. Later Pankhurst moved to Geneva to live with a family friend, but, when her father died in 1898, returned home to help her mother raise the rest of the children.

Activism

Suffrage

In 1905 Christabel Pankhurst interrupted a Liberal Party meeting by shouting demands for voting rights for women. She was arrested and, along with fellow suffragette Annie Kenney, went to prison rather than pay a fine as punishment for their outburst. Their case gained much media interest and the ranks of the WSPU swelled following their trial. Emmeline Pankhurst began to take more militant action for the women's suffrage cause after her daughter's arrest and was herself imprisoned on many occasions for her principles.

After obtaining her law degree in 1906, Christabel moved to the London headquarters of the WSPU, where she was appointed its organising secretary. Nicknamed "Queen of the Mob", she was jailed again in 1907 in Parliament Square and in 1909 after the "Rush Trial" at Bow Street Magistrates' Court. Between 1913 and 1914 she lived in Paris to escape imprisonment under the terms of the Prisoner's (Temporary Discharge for Ill-Health) Act, better known as the "Cat and Mouse Act" but continued to provided editorial lead to The Suffragette through visitors such as Annie Kenney and Ida Wylie who crossed the Channel for her advice. Other campaigners visited Paris to have Christmas dinner with her in 1912; these included Irene Dallas, Hilda Dallas, Blanche Edwards and Alice Morgan Wright.

The start of World War I compelled her to return to England in 1914, where she was again arrested. Pankhurst engaged in a hunger strike, ultimately serving only 30 days of a three-year sentence.

She was influential in the WSPU's "anti-male" phase after the failure of the Conciliation Bills. She wrote a book called The Great Scourge and How to End It on the subject of sexually transmitted diseases and how sexual equality (votes for women) would help the fight against these diseases.

She and her sister Sylvia did not get along. Sylvia was against turning the WSPU towards solely upper- and middle-class women and using militant tactics, while Christabel thought it was essential. Christabel felt that suffrage was a cause that should not be tied to any causes trying to help working-class women with their other issues. She felt that it would only drag the suffrage movement down and that all of the other issues could be solved once women had the right to vote.

Wartime activities
On 8 September 1914, Pankhurst re-appeared at London's Royal Opera House after her long exile, to utter a declaration on "The German Peril", a campaign led by the former General Secretary of the WSPU, Norah Dacre Fox in conjunction with the British Empire Union and the National Party. Along with Norah Dacre Fox (later known as Norah Elam), Pankhurst toured the country making recruiting speeches. Her sister Sylvia's memoir included a reference to some of Christabel's supporters handing the white feather to every young man they encountered wearing civilian dress. 

The Suffragette appeared again on 16 April 1915 as a war paper and on 15 October changed its name to Britannia. In its pages, week by week, Pankhurst called for the military conscription of men and the industrial conscription of women into national service. She called also for the internment of all people of enemy nationality, men and women, young and old, found on these shores. Her supporters bobbed up at Hyde Park meetings with placards: "Intern Them All". She also championed a more complete and thorough enforcement of the blockade of enemy and neutral nations, arguing that this must be "a war of attrition". She demanded the resignation of Sir Edward Grey, Lord Robert Cecil, General Sir William Robertson and Sir Eyre Crowe, whom she considered too mild and dilatory in method. Britannia was many times raided by the police and experienced greater difficulty in appearing than had befallen The Suffragette. Indeed, although occasionally Norah Dacre Fox's father, John Doherty, who owned a printing firm, was drafted in to print campaign posters, Britannia was compelled at last to set up its own printing press. Emmeline Pankhurst proposed to set up Women's Social and Political Union Homes for illegitimate girl "war babies", but only five children were adopted. David Lloyd George, whom Pankhurst had regarded as the most bitter and dangerous enemy of women, was now the one politician in whom she and Emmeline Pankhurst placed confidence.

1918 General Election campaign in Smethwick

After some British women were granted the right to vote at the end of World War I, Pankhurst announced that she would stand in the 1918 general election. At first she said she would contest Westbury in Wiltshire but at the last minute stood as a Women's Party candidate, in the Smethwick constituency in alliance with the Lloyd George/Conservative Coalition. She was not issued with the "Coalition Coupon" letter signed by both Liberal and Unionist leaders. Her campaign focussed on a "Victorious Peace", "the Germans must pay for the War" and "Britain for the British". She was narrowly defeated, by only 775 votes, by the Labour Party candidate, local trade union leader John Davison.

Move to California
Leaving England in 1921, she moved to the United States where she eventually became an evangelist with Plymouth Brethren links and became a prominent member of Second Adventist movement.

Prophetic interests

Marshall, Morgan, and Scott published her works on subjects related to her prophetic outlook, which took its character from John Nelson Darby's perspectives. Pankhurst lectured and wrote books on the Second Coming. She was a frequent guest on TV shows in the 1950s and had a reputation for being an odd combination of "former suffragist revolutionary, evangelical Christian, and almost stereotypically proper 'English Lady' who always was in demand as a lecturer". While in California, she adopted her daughter Betty, finally having recovered from her mother's death.

Damehood

She returned to Britain for a period in the 1930s and was appointed a Dame Commander of the Order of the British Empire "for public and social services" in the 1936 New Year Honours. At the onset of World War II she again left for the United States, to live in Los Angeles, California.

Death
Christabel died 13 February 1958, at the age of 77, sitting in a straight-backed chair. Her housekeeper found her body and there was no indication of her cause of death. She was buried in the Woodlawn Memorial Cemetery in Santa Monica, California.

Posthumous recognition

A  profile bust of Christabel Pankhurst on the right pylon of the Emmeline and Christabel Pankhurst Memorial in Victoria Tower Gardens was added to the memorial in 1959; it was unveiled on 13 July 1959 by Viscount Kilmuir. Her name and image (and those of 58 other women's suffrage supporters) are etched on the plinth of the statue of Millicent Fawcett in Parliament Square, London, that was unveiled in 2018.

In 2006, a blue plaque for Christabel and her mother was placed by English Heritage at 50, Clarendon Road, Notting Hill, London W11 3AD, where they had lived. Another blue plaque was erected on 19 October 2018 by the Marchmont Association at 8 Russell Square, London, WC1B 5BE.

Works

See also 
History of feminism
List of suffragists and suffragettes
Suffragette bombing and arson campaign
List of women's rights activists
Pankhurst Centre in Manchester
Timeline of women's suffrage
Women's suffrage in the United Kingdom
Women's suffrage organisations

References

Further reading
 Christabel Pankhurst, Pressing Problems of the Closing Age (Morgan & Scott Ltd., 1924).
 Christabel Pankhurst, The World's Unrest: Visions of the Dawn (Morgan & Scott Ltd., 1926).
 David Mitchell, Queen Christabel (MacDonald and Jane's Publisher Ltd., 1977) 
 Barbara Castle, Sylvia and Christabel Pankhurst (Penguin Books, 1987) .
 Timothy Larsen, Christabel Pankhurst: Fundamentalism and Feminism in Coalition (Boydell Press, 2002).
 Hallam, David J.A. Taking on the Men: the first women parliamentary candidates 1918 (Brewin Books, 2018 . Contains a chapter and analysis on Christabel Pankhurst's campaign in Smethwick, 1918.

External links

 
 1908 audio recording of Christabel Pankhurst speaking
 http://www.spartacus-educational.com/WpankhurstC.htm
Blue Plaque for Suffragette Leaders Emmeline and Christabel Pankhurst

British feminists
English feminists
English suffragettes
English women writers
Feminism and history
Alumni of the University of Manchester
Dames Commander of the Order of the British Empire
People from Los Angeles
People from Old Trafford
1880 births
1958 deaths
People educated at Manchester High School for Girls
Burials at Woodlawn Memorial Cemetery, Santa Monica
Christabel
Eagle House suffragettes
Women's Social and Political Union